The Holland–Bukit Timah Group Representation Constituency is a four-member Group Representation Constituency (GRC) located in the central, western and northern areas of Singapore. Holland–Bukit Timah GRC is known as amongst the wealthiest electoral divisions in the entire country, due to the predominance of Good Class Bungalows (GCB) landed homes, which are predominantly owned by the wealthiest citizens within the country. The GRC consists of four divisions: Cashew, Bukit Timah, Ulu Pandan and Zhenghua. The current MPs are Vivian Balakrishnan, Sim Ann, Christopher de Souza and Edward Chia from the People's Action Party (PAP).

History
Originally known as the Holland–Bukit Panjang Group Representation Constituency, it was renamed to its present name due to the Bukit Panjang ward of the GRC being carved out to form a Single Member Constituency, in return the Bukit Timah Single Member Constituency was absorbed. A large portion of Holland–Bukit Timah GRC is made up of jungle and nature reserve, namely the Bukit Timah Nature Reserve and the Central Water Catchment.

Town Council

Holland–Bukit Timah Town Council are operating under the Bukit Panjang SMC and the Holland-Bukit Timah GRC.

Members of Parliament

Electoral results

Elections in 2000s

Elections in 2010s

Elections in 2020s

References

External links
2020 General Election's result
2015 General Election's result
2011 General Election's result
2006 General Election's result
2001 General Election's result
1997 General Election's result
1991 General Election's result
1988 General Election's result

Singaporean electoral divisions
Bukit Panjang
Bukit Timah
Central Water Catchment
Clementi
Jurong East
Mandai
Queenstown, Singapore